Maii may refer to:

 Maii language
 Parasqualidus maii, a species of cyprinid fish
 Coyote (Navajo mythology) (Navajo: mąʼii), characters in Navajo mythology
 Jemez Pueblo, New Mexico (Navajo: Mąʼii Deeshgiizh), a census-designated place in Sandoval County, New Mexico, United States